Ifta or IFTA may refer to:
Ifta, a municipality in Thuringia, Germany
Ifta (river), a river in Thuringia, Germany
Independent Film & Television Alliance
Institute for Truth in Accounting 
International Federation of Teachers' Associations
International Federation of Technical Analysts
International Fuel Tax Agreement
Internet Tax Freedom Act
Irish Film & Television Academy
Ifta (islamic term)